The Little Ten Conference is the oldest continuous high school athletic conference in the state of Illinois.  Founded in 1919, it comprised the following small high schools in northern Illinois: Earlville, Hinckley, Leland, Paw Paw, Plano, Rollo, Sandwich, Shabbona, Somonauk, and Waterman.  The conference is still in operation and currently consists of the following members: DePue, Earlville, Hinckley-Big Rock, Indian Creek, Kirkland Hiawatha, LaMoille, Leland, Newark, Serena, Somonauk, and the Illinois Mathematics and Science Academy (IMSA). Over the years, there have been a number of other area schools in the conference, including Malta.

Eight of the original ten schools are still members in some form.  Charter members consist of Earlville, Leland, Somonauk, Hinckley (now combined into Hinckley Big Rock), and Paw Paw, Shabbona, Waterman, & Rollo (which have respectively merged to form Indian Creek.)

In February 2019, the Little Ten Conference held its 100th league boys basketball tournament.

Schools in the conference compete in 8-Man Football, Competitive Cheer, Competitive Dance, Music, Boys Soccer, Girls Volleyball, Boys and Girls Basketball, Boys Baseball and Girls Softball.

Current Membership 

♠ Earlville and Leland combined athletic programs in 2006 becoming Leland-Earlville but separated in 2018
♥ Shabbona and Waterman consolidated to form Indian Creek in 1993.
♦ Harding and Sheridan Schools consolidated with Serena creating the Serena CUSD in 1938.
♣ Harding and Sheridan merged with Serena, creating CUSD2 in 1938.
Sources:IHSA Conferences, IHSA Coop Teams, and IHSA Member Schools Directory

Previous members

Junior High Conference
The Junior High schools of the respective communities have a conference, comprising
Earlville
Leland
Somonauk
Indian Creek
Hinckley Big Rock
Paw Paw
Newark
Lisbon
Serena

High School Conference Members, Past and Present
IMSA (2021-)
DePue (2020-)
Earlville (1919–2006, 2018-)*
Leland (1919–2006, 2018-)*
Paw Paw (1919-2018, Co-op in sports with Indian Creek)*
Malta (1967–2000, school was closed, students now attend DeKalb High School)
Kirkland Hiawatha (2006-)
Plano (1919–1967, Joined Northeast Conference, then Interstate Eight Conference in 1979-80 with Sandwich)*
Sandwich (1919–1967, Joined Northeast Conference, then Interstate Eight Conference in 1979-80 with Plano)*
Serena (1938-, formed out of merger with Harding and Sheridan schools)
Hinckley (1919–1957)*
Hinckley-Big Rock (1957-2019, school district merged with Big Rock)
Hinckley Big Rock (2019-, school district removed the dash from its name)
Shabbona (1919–1993)*
Waterman (1919–1993)*
Indian Creek (1993-, Shabbona/Waterman school districts merged)
Newark (1967-)
LaMoille-Ohio (1996-)
Somonauk (1919-)*
Sheridan (1930–1939), school closed and district merged with Serena; Elementary school still open, but part of a different conference.)
Rollo (1919–1954), school closed and district merged with Shabbona, and became part of Indian Creek)*

* Original conference members

Mascots and Colors
The schools are represented by the following team nicknames:
Big Rock - Bobcats - blue & gold
DePue - Little Giants - blue & orange
Earlville - Raiders - red, black, & white 
Hinckley - Hawks - blue and gold
Hinckley-Big Rock - Royals - blue & white
IMSA - Titans - columbia blue & silver
Indian Creek - Timberwolves - red, black, & white
Kirkland Hiawatha - Hawks - navy & gold
LaMoille - Lions - red and white
Leland - Panthers - kelly green & black
Malta - Mustangs - red and white
Newark - Norsemen - Royal Blue & White
Paw Paw - Bulldogs - purple & yellow
Plano - Reapers - purple & white
Rollo - Eagles - blue and orange
Serena - Huskers - purple and gold
Shabbona - Indians - red & white
Sheridan - Cardinals - red & white
Somonauk - Bobcats - blue & yellow
Waterman - Wolverines - red & black

Membership timeline

Boys Basketball Tournament and Regular Season Championships

Girls Basketball Championships

References

External links 
  - A History of the Little Ten Conference Basketball Tournament
  - Documentation on those member schools that are now defunct
  - DePue Joining Little Ten Conference Article

1919 establishments in Illinois
Illinois high school sports conferences